África Peñalver Roland (born 15 February 2000) is a Spanish fashion model. She has appeared on the cover of the Spanish edition of Vogue twice.

Early life
Peñalver studied at Lycée Français de Valence, a French-speaking high school in Valencia. Before modeling, she was an equestrian.

Career 

In 2017, Peñalver debuted as a JW Anderson exclusive and walked for the likes of Chanel, Dior, Maison Margiela, Elie Saab, Prada Resort, Loewe, Rodarte (which she closed), Valentino, Alaïa, Isabel Marant, Altuzarra, and Giambattista Valli that year. In January 2019, she appeared on the cover of Vogue España and in February 2020, she appeared on a digital cover of the magazine. Inés Sastre, Miriam Sánchez, and Marina Pérez appeared on the physical cover. In the United Kingdom, she appeared on the cover of The Times's style magazine.

Models.com chose her as one of the "Top Newcomers" (in the breakout category) of the F/W 2020 season.

Personal life 
Peñalver supports the Black Lives Matter movement and is interested in anti-racism education. She is also an avid surfer.

References 

2000 births
Living people
People from Valencia
Spanish female models
The Society Management models
Elite Model Management models